Stolt is a surname. Notable people with the surname include:

 Roine Stolt (born 1956), Swedish guitarist, vocalist, and composer
 William Alex Stolt (1900–2001), American mayor

See also
 Jacob Stolt-Nielsen (1931–2015), Norwegian businessman